Frank Hays may refer to:

Frank Kerr Hays (1896–1988), American World War I flying ace
Frank L. Hays (1922–2003), 35th Lieutenant Governor of Colorado, United States

See also
Frank Hayes (disambiguation)